The 2010 Hardcore Justice (stylized HardCORE Justice, and occasionally referred to as Hardcore Justice: The Last Stand) was a professional wrestling pay-per-view event produced by Total Nonstop Action Wrestling (TNA), which took place on August 8, 2010 at the Impact Zone in Orlando, Florida. It was the sixth event under the Hard Justice chronology and the eighth event of the 2010 TNA pay-per-view schedule.

In October 2017, with the launch of the Global Wrestling Network, the event became available to stream on demand.

Storylines

Hardcore Justice featured seven professional wrestling matches that involved different wrestlers from pre-existing scripted feuds and storylines. Wrestlers portrayed villains, heroes, or less distinguishable characters in the scripted events that built tension and culminated in a wrestling match or series of matches.

This year, TNA changed the event's name from Hard Justice to Hardcore Justice in honor of the Extreme Championship Wrestling reunion show theme that it adopted. The show was originally going to be main evented by a match between Rob Van Dam and Jerry Lynn. However, the match had to be cancelled when Lynn pulled out due to a back injury. The replacement main event was Rob Van Dam vs. Sabu.

Event
In addition to matches, Hardcore Justice featured TNA stars such as A.J. Styles, Matt Morgan, Jesse Neal, and Madison Rayne sharing their memories of ECW, and dedications to Joey Styles, Paul Heyman, and all the ECW alumni who had died since working for the promotion. Tod Gordon, "Pitbull" Gary Wolfe, The Blue Meanie, and Francine appeared in pre-taped segments.

During the show, two substitutes appeared for ECW alumni: Big Tilly appeared as "Blue Tilly" as part of Stevie Richards' BW2.0 (the name being a play on the EV2.0 stable). Meanwhile, Samuel Shaw portrayed Lupus, a minor member of Raven's Nest.

After losing to Richards, P.J. Polaco attacked Richards with a Singapore Cane, until the Sandman came out to attack him in turn.

Following their victory over Rotten and Kahoneys, Team 3D declared themselves the most extreme tag team in wrestling, after which The Gangstas confronted them. Following the confrontation, all six men celebrated together in the ring.

Results

The Whole F'n Show

The Whole F'n Show was the original card which was supposed to take place at Hardcore Justice four days earlier, but the show was given to the ECW Originals. This event was held as a special pay-per-view quality show on Impact Wrestling.

See also
ECW One Night Stand (2005)
ECW One Night Stand (2006)
Hardcore Homecoming

References

External links
Hardcorejustice.com
Hard Justice at In Demand.com
TNA Wrestling.com

Hardcore Justice
2010 in professional wrestling in Florida
Events in Orlando, Florida
Extreme Championship Wrestling reunions and revivals
Professional wrestling in Orlando, Florida
April 2010 events in the United States
2010 Total Nonstop Action Wrestling pay-per-view events